Ramsay–Fox Round Barn and Farm is a historic round barn and farm in West Township, Marshall County, Indiana. The farmstead was established about 1900. The round barn was built about 1911 and is a true-circular barn, with a  diameter. It has a two-pitch gambrel roof topped by a cupola and consists of a main level and basement. Also contributing are the farm site, farmhouse (c. 1900), milk house (c. 1900), windmill (c. 1920), and privy (c. 1900).

It was listed on the National Register of Historic Places in 2012.

References

Round barns in Indiana
Farms on the National Register of Historic Places in Indiana
Barns on the National Register of Historic Places in Indiana
Houses completed in 1900
1900 establishments in Indiana
Buildings and structures in Marshall County, Indiana
National Register of Historic Places in Marshall County, Indiana